Eric Mergenthaler (2 September 1963 – 15 April 2020) was a Mexican Olympic sailor. He competed at the highest levels of the sport in the Finn class and won honorific medals in three Finn World Championships, including the golden medal in Cádiz, making him World Champion in 1992. Mergenthaler also represented Mexico in the 1984, 1988, and 1992 Summer Olympic games.

Mergenthaler died on 15 April 2020 following a bicycle accident four days prior in Mexico City.  He was 56.

References

1963 births
2020 deaths
Mexican male sailors (sport)
Sailors at the 1984 Summer Olympics – Finn
Sailors at the 1988 Summer Olympics – Finn
Sailors at the 1992 Summer Olympics – Finn
Olympic sailors of Mexico
Finn class world champions
Finn class sailors
Cycling road incident deaths